Tiina Rosenberg (born Tiina Pursiainen; 7 July 1958) is a Finnish-born Swedish academic and feminist, who is Professor of Performance Studies at Stockholm University. She has formerly been Professor of Gender Studies at Stockholm University and Lund University, and rector of the University of the Arts Helsinki.

Career
Rosenberg was born and raised in Finland, but made her academic career in Sweden. She studied theatre, film and literature studies at Stockholm University, and earned her PhD in 1993 with the dissertation En regissörs estetik: Ludvig Josephson och den tidigare teaterregin (A director's aesthetics). Her research areas include gender studies, theatre studies, queer studies, feminist theory and cultural studies.

Rosenberg has previously been a Professor of Gender Studies at Stockholm University and at Lund University, and was the inspector of Småland Nation, Lund from 2006 to 2012. She served as rector of the University of the Arts Helsinki from 2013 to 2015. She frequently appears in the role of public intellectual in the areas of cultural policy, equality, democracy, and human rights.

Rosenberg defines herself as a queer feminist. She is a founding member of the feminist party Feminist Initiative and was formerly a member of the party's executive board.

References 

1958 births
Feminist Initiative (Sweden) politicians
Swedish LGBT writers
Living people
Academic staff of Lund University
Queer theorists
Academic staff of Stockholm University
Swedish feminists
Swedish people of Finnish descent
21st-century Swedish women politicians
Swedish women academics
Queer feminists